Notting Hill Press, founded in 2012 by authors Michele Gorman, Belinda Jones and Talli Roland, was a British book publisher.

Notting Hill Press published authors such as Chrissie Manby, Matt Dunn, and Nick Spalding to offer writers "the third way".

Describing itself as a hybrid publishing model that combined the best of traditional and independent publishing, Notting Hill Press allowed authors to maintain the solid working relationships they have with their traditional publishers, while also recognising that some books are better-suited to independent publishing in some situations.

Notting Hill Press was a chick lit, romantic comedy imprint and stated that it does not accept submissions from authors or their agents.

Notting Hill Press was disbanded in 2020.

References

External links
 
 "Author Collectives: Notting Hill Press", The Self-Made Writer, 26 May 2015.

Book publishing companies based in London
Publishing companies established in 2012
2012 establishments in England
British companies established in 2012
Publishing companies disestablished in 2020